Tichy is a town and commune in Béjaïa Province, northern Algeria.

Communes of Béjaïa Province